Saint-Claude or St. Claude can refer to:

Saints
 Claudius of Besançon (–696 or 699), French abbot
 Claude La Colombière (1641–1682), French Jesuit priest

Places
Canada
St. Claude, Manitoba
Saint-Claude, Quebec

France
 Arrondissement of Saint-Claude, Jura
 Avignon-lès-Saint-Claude, Jura
 Saint-Claude (Besançon), Doubs
 Saint-Claude, Guadeloupe
 Saint-Claude, Jura
 Saint-Claude-de-Diray, Loir-et-Cher

United States
 St. Claude, New Orleans, Louisiana, a neighborhood

Other uses
"Saint Claude" (song), by Christine and the Queens
Roman Catholic Diocese of Saint-Claude